Freelandia was a low-cost counter-culture airline company owned by founder Kenneth Moss that operated in 1973 and the beginning of 1974.  The company operated an aircraft that flew between various destinations, but in an attempt to avoid regulation by the Civil Aeronautics Board, the company did not call itself an airline.  Instead, it positioned itself as a travel club, with paid members who voted where the aircraft would fly.  It operated only one leased DC-8-21, but lower than expected sales caused the company to cease operations in 1974 after its aircraft was repossessed for non-payment.   After its demise, the company and its founder were charged with false advertising and fraudulent business practices by the State of California.

History
Company founder Kenneth Moss made $1.5 million in the stock market before he was 26.   He invested $1.15 million of his own funds into the company, and received certification from the Federal Aviation Administration on August 7, 1973.   The company was founded as a non profit; Moss reported that income in excess of operating costs would be donated to worthy causes such as free clinics, free schools, and artists.  In order to avoid Civil Aeronautics Board regulation of its routes, it did not call itself an airline, but a travel club, with members voting on where the company's planes would fly. The company said that it had obtained landing rights in Hong Kong, Yugoslavia, and South America.

It flew one aircraft, a DC-8-21 which was painted entirely in a semi-dark yellow with a waving hand as its logo on the tail.   It was equipped with 149 seats with first class leg room and a 7-seat lounge that would allow the passengers to mingle.   Many of the seats were later removed and replaced with pillows with seat belts. It was decorated in what the company described as a "far-out chocolate-and-cream color".   In-flight service offered organic food, rock music, and a waterbed.  Entertainment options included books, chess, video games, and a pinball machine.  All of the company's flight personnel had at least 10,000 hours flight experience.  The company planned to add additional aircraft to its fleet every time the membership increased by 8,000.

Fares were announced as $69 from Honolulu to San Francisco, $12.50 from San Francisco to Los Angeles, $69 from Los Angeles to New York, and $100 from New York to Brussels.  In order to get those discounted rates, travellers had to obtain a membership, with an annual fee of $50 for adults and $25 for kids under 12.  The advertised fares were about $30 cheaper than other airlines for the flight from San Francisco to Honolulu, and about $200 less than usual for flights from the West Coast to Brussels.  The company stated that three thousand people had signed up with the club before its first flight.  Its first flight took place on September 18, 1973 from San Francisco to Honolulu.

Demise
Operations ended within a year of its creation due to low sales. In November 1973, overseas flights were scrapped because the company could not fill the flights. In May 1974, the company's aircraft was repossessed by the leasing company for non-payment.  It flew an estimated 40 or 50 flights, mostly coast to coast, before operations ceased, but interest from members wasn't enough to fill the flights to make them profitable.  Despite saying that flights to Hawaii would occur three times per month, it only flew there twice and the second time it had trouble obtaining fuel for the return flight.

In late 1974, the company and its founder were charged in a civil suit by the State of California for false advertising and fraudulent business practices. While the company had been set up as a non-profit business, the founder also set up three other for-profit corporations that were paid by the company to perform various services. Rolling Stone Magazine claimed that the founder stood to make several million dollars from the venture.

In 1976, Moss settled the suit for $60,000, but paid no money because his net worth was listed as less than $1,000.

Moss scandal
After Freelandia airline operations ceased, founder Kenneth Moss was implicated in the death of Robbie McIntosh, drummer of the Average White Band. Moss was charged with murder and unlawfully providing narcotics during a party at his home in September 1974. He pleaded guilty to involuntary manslaughter and was sentenced to 120 days in jail and four years' probation. Moss served three months at a Malibu work farm.

See also 
 List of defunct airlines of the United States

References

External links
The Crimson: Flying High on Air Freelandia
Time magazine: Freelandia

Defunct airlines of the United States
Airlines established in 1973
Airlines disestablished in 1974
American companies established in 1973